= Pictures Please =

Canadian children's television series

- Genre: Children's television
- Country of origin: Canada
- Original language: English
- No. of seasons: 1
- No. of episodes: 12

Production
- Producer: Fred Rainsberry
- Production locations: Ottawa, Ontario
- Running time: 15 minutes

Original release
- Network: CBC Television
- Release: 9 July – 24 September 1956

Pictures Please is a Canadian children's television series that aired on CBC Television in 1956.

== Premise ==
This series for children was produced in Ottawa by Fred Rainsberry.

Fire safety was the subject of the second episode (16 July 1956), featuring guest Maynard Dolman, chief of Ottawa's Fire Department. Comic illustrations were used to demonstrate the topic.

== Scheduling ==
Pictures Please aired for 15 minutes each Monday at 5:45 p.m. from 9 July to 24 September 1956.
